Abildgaard is a Danish surname. Notable people with the surname include:

Nicolai Abildgaard (1743–1809), Danish painter
Oliver Abildgaard (born 1996), Danish footballer
 (1916–1990), Danish poet
 (1740–1801), Danish physician and veterinarian
Søren Abildgaard (1718–1791), Danish  naturalist, writer and illustrator
 (1826–1884), one of the tenants of the thranite movement

Danish-language surnames